Barkino is a rural locality (a village) in Moshokskoye Rural Settlement, Sudogodsky District, Vladimir Oblast, Russia. The population was 28 as of 2010.

Geography 
Barkino is located 8 km north from Moshok, 41 km southeast of Sudogda (the district's administrative centre) by road. Krasny Kust is the nearest rural locality.

References 

Rural localities in Sudogodsky District